Maroona is a rural village in the western region of Victoria, Australia. Maroona is part of the statistical area of Tatyoon which at the 2021 Census, had a population of 80.

Maroona sits on the junction of the Western standard gauge line and the Portland railway line. They were converted to standard gauge in 1995. The grain handling facility at Maroona railway station has been closed.

References

Towns in Victoria (Australia)
Western District (Victoria)